Corey Cogdell (born September 2, 1986 in Palmer, Alaska) is an American trapshooter. She is a two-time Olympic bronze medal winner in the Women's Trap; at the 2008 Summer Olympics and the 2016 Summer Olympics .  She was also the bronze medalist at the 2007 Pan American Games in the Women's Trap event. Cogdell also competed at the 2012 Summer Olympics.

Corey made the National Development Team in 2006 at Fall Selection when she placed first in the junior women's trap competition. That same day, she made the National Team when her score also placed her third in the open women's trap competition.  Corey is currently living at the Olympic Training Center as a resident athlete.

Career results

Personal life
Cogdell is married to former NFL defensive tackle Mitch Unrein, whom she started dating in 2010.

She is a lifetime member of the NRA.

References

External links
 Bio on USAShooting.org
 Corey Cogdell Bio
 Corey Cogdell Twitter Profile

1986 births
American female sport shooters
Living people
Olympic bronze medalists for the United States in shooting
People from Palmer, Alaska
Shooters at the 2007 Pan American Games
Shooters at the 2008 Summer Olympics
Shooters at the 2012 Summer Olympics
Shooters at the 2016 Summer Olympics
Trap and double trap shooters
Medalists at the 2008 Summer Olympics
American hunters
Pan American Games bronze medalists for the United States
Medalists at the 2016 Summer Olympics
Sportspeople from Anchorage, Alaska
Pan American Games medalists in shooting
Medalists at the 2007 Pan American Games
21st-century American women